Eduardo Valencia Ospina (born 19 September, 1939) is a Colombian lawyer, politician, and current member of the International Law Commission (ILC). Valencia Ospina holds an LL.M. from Harvard Law School (1963) where he was also a "Special Graduate Student" in 1964, a PhD in Juridical Sciences and a PhD in Economic Sciences from the Pontificia Universidad Javeriana in Bogotá, Colombia.

Biography
A member of an aristocratic Cali family, Valencia Ospina first attended the Pontificia Universidad Javeriana in Bogotá, where he was eventually granted a Harvard scholarship. He joined the United Nations in 1964 and worked for 36 years on its legal and judicial activities, before retiring in the year 2000 with the rank of Assistant Secretary-General, the fourth highest in the organization. He was Senior Legal Officer in the Office of Legal Affairs and, most notably, was the registrar of the International Court of Justice (ICJ) from 1987 to 2000, the only South American to hold that position. He is also the second longest serving registrar of the ICJ. In November 2016, he was elected to serve for a third term as a member of the International Law Commission. At the ILC, Valencia Ospina served as First Vice-Chair during its 69th session in 2017, and as Chair during its 70th session in 2018. In 2007, he was also appointed special rapporteur for the report on the "Protection of persons in the event of disasters". The Commission adopted the resulting "Draft articles on the protection of persons in the event of disasters" in 2016. The draft articles were subsequently submitted to the United Nations General Assembly and put on its agenda.

Ospina is a former president of the Latin American Society of International Law. He also served on the board of several international law journals, including the Journal of International Dispute Settlement. Most notably, he was the editor in chief of the journal The Law and Practice of International Courts and Tribunals. Ospina is also an international arbitrator and an external counsel in cases before the ICJ. He is in particular a lawyer for Colombia in the maritime border dispute case with Nicaragua. In October 25, 2022, Ospina was designated by Gustavo Petro as the lead counsel.

References

Living people
1940 births
20th-century Colombian lawyers
Colombian politicians
International Court of Justice
International Law Commission officials
Colombian officials of the United Nations
Pontifical Xavierian University alumni
Harvard Law School alumni

Members of the International Law Commission